Sea smoke, frost smoke, or steam fog is fog which is formed when very cold air moves over warmer water.  Arctic sea smoke is sea smoke forming over small patches of open water in sea ice.

It forms when a light wind of very cold air mixes with a shallow layer of saturated warm air immediately above the warmer water.  The warmer air is cooled beyond the dew point and can no longer hold as much water vapor, so the excess condenses out. The effect is similar to the "steam" produced over a hot bath or a hot drink, or even an exercising person.

Sea smoke has a turbulent appearance and may form spiraling columns. It is usually not very high and lookouts on ships can usually see over it (but small boats may have very poor visibility) because the fog is confined to the layer of warm air above the sea.  However, sea smoke columns 20–30 m (70–100 ft) high have been observed. Because this type of fog requires very low air temperatures, it is uncommon in temperate climates, but is common in the Arctic and Antarctic.

See also
 Steam devil

References

Further reading
 Sea Smoke and Steam Fog, by P. M. Saunders (Woods Hole Oceanographic Institution, Massachusetts (Manuscript received 9 July 1963: in revised form 29 January 1964), 551.551.8:551.575.1

Marine meteorology
Articles containing video clips
Fog

de:Nebel#Mischungsnebel
fr:Brouillard#Types